Tony Palmer (born February 23, 1983) is a former American football guard. The former University of Missouri guard who was selected by the St. Louis Rams. He was signed by the Green Bay Packers after being cut in the 2006 preseason by St. Louis. Palmer was released by the Packers in the 2008 offseason.

Early years
Was selected First-team All-state by the Daily Oklahoman as well as All-Metro and All-city honors  on offense. He also had a solid defensive career as well, racking up 133 tackles and forcing 11 fumbles, with six of the forced fumbles as a senior.

College career
At the University of Missouri he was voted First-team All-Big 12 his senior season. Also, he was Second-team All-Big 12 in 2004 and was honorable mention in 2003. As a freshman, in 2002, he was named to the Big 12 All-Freshman team.

Professional career

Pre-draft
Palmer ran a 5.52 40-yard dash at the University of Missouri Pro Day and bench-pressed 225 pounds 41 times.

St. Louis Rams
Palmer was drafted with the 235th pick (7th round) of the 2006 NFL Draft. He was cut by the Rams in August, 2006.

Green Bay Packers
He was signed by the Packers and remained with the club for the 2006 and 2007 season. He was released in the 2008 off-season.

Personal life
Palmer is a cousin of former MLB star, Joe Carter.

References

External links
NFL.com player page

1983 births
Living people
American football offensive guards
Green Bay Packers players
Missouri Tigers football players
People from Midwest City, Oklahoma
Players of American football from Oklahoma
Sportspeople from Oklahoma County, Oklahoma